Pressure perturbation calorimetry (PPC) is a technique closely related to isothermal titration calorimetry (ITC) and differential scanning calorimetry (DSC). In brief, PPC measures heat changes associated with dilute aqueous solutions of proteins or other biomolecules in response to introduction of relatively small pressure perturbations (± 5 atm). Importantly, such heat changes can be related to thermodynamic properties of proteins such as hydration and conformational transitions upon folding and/or ligand binding.

See also
 Differential scanning calorimetry
 Isothermal microcalorimetry
 Isothermal titration calorimetry
 Sorption calorimetry

Bibliography

 
 
 

Calorimetry